The Junta of the Philippines, or Sessions of the Junta of the Royal Company of the Philippines (Spanish: Junta de la Compañía de Filipinas) is an oil-on-canvas painting, c. 1815, by the Spanish artist Francisco Goya.

The work is the largest Goya produced. It was commissioned that year to commemorate the March 30th annual meeting of the Royal Company of the Philippines (Real Compañía de Filipinas) attended by 51 shareholders and members during a period when Goya was disillusioned by the formerly exiled Ferdinand VII's return to the Spanish crown, which moved away from enlightenment and ended the hopes of Spanish liberals for a more progressive Spain.

Description

The Junta of the Philippines painting captures a moment when, unexpectedly, Ferdinand decided to attend the meeting of the Junta, intending his presence to be an affirmation of his commitment to the empire. However, it had the opposite effect; the Spanish economy and empire lay in ruins after the Peninsular War, the Royal Company of the Philippines was by that time so unprofitable and ineffective as to be irrelevant, and Ferdinand was a king who had learned nothing from the turmoil of the preceding years when he was overthrown. Ferdinand's return led to mass emigration and exile amongst the Spanish intellectual class. Although Goya remained in Spain for a number of years and continued to depict his king, he too fled in exile to France in 1824.

As with his c. 1800 Charles IV of Spain and His Family, the Spanish king is portrayed in full pomp and finery, albeit through barely concealed gritted teeth. Ferdinand is shown in the center middle-ground, seated at a raised table and flanked by trembling associates. To his left sits Miguel de Lardazibal, minister for the Indies, who was imprisoned the following September and forced into exile by the crown. Before these men, the assembly members are massed in two groups divided left and right by carpet. An expanse of light spills across the floor, spread before the absolute monarch, and lit from a source situated near the viewer of the painting. While the work was painted on commission and intended to hang in the ceremonial hall in which it was set, it highlights in an unflattering manner the centrality and impotent grip of the king. To art historian Albert Boime, the painting shows a monarch who rules not through respect, but through last resort; absolute power and fear.

See also
List of works by Francisco Goya

Notes

Bibliography
 Boime, Albert. Art in an age of counterrevolution, 1815-1848. Chicago University Press, 2004. 
 Hughes, Robert. Goya. New York: Alfred A. Knopf, 2004. 
 Junquera, Juan José. The Black Paintings of Goya. London: Scala Publishers, 2008. 
 Roskill, Mark W. The interpretation of pictures. University of Massachusetts, 1989.

External links

Paintings by Francisco Goya
1815 paintings
Paintings in Occitania (administrative region)